Alan M. Washbond (October 14, 1899 – July 30, 1965) was an American bobsledder who competed in the 1930s. A native of Keene Valley, New York, he won the gold medal in the two-man event at the 1936 Winter Olympics in Garmisch-Partenkirchen.

A street in Keene Valley, Alan Washbond Drive, is named in his honor. His son, Waightman, competed for the US in bobsleigh at the 1948 and 1956 Winter Olympics.

References
Bobsleigh two-man Olympic medalists 1932-56 and since 1964
Brainyhistory.com profile
D'Espo Funeral Home announcement of Waightman Washbond's 2006 death. - accessed May 8, 2008
Hudson Art Gallery on Alan Washbond Drive in Keene Valley, NY

1899 births
1965 deaths
American male bobsledders
Bobsledders at the 1936 Winter Olympics
Olympic gold medalists for the United States in bobsleigh
People from Keene, New York
Medalists at the 1936 Winter Olympics